Barbara French Read, also known as Barbara Reed, (December 29, 1917 – December 12, 1963) was a Canadian-American film actress of the 1930s and 1940s, who appeared in 21 films during her career.

Early life
Born Barbara French Read on December 29, 1917, the daughter of contractor John Howard Read and Nancy Elizabeth Collier, in Port Arthur, Ontario, Read moved to California in the mid-1930s. She got her first movie contract while living in Laguna Beach, California: she was watching a film production in Laguna when she was spotted and offered a screen test, after which she entered a six-month contract with the production company. When she failed to receive any roles because of her lack of experience, she joined the Laguna Beach Players theater, where she acted in a new play each month for two years.

Film career
Her first film appearance was one of the three principal girls in the 1936 comedy film Three Smart Girls, which also starred Deanna Durbin and Nan Grey. From 1937 through 1939, Read appeared in nine films, most notably starring in The Spellbinder, opposite Lee Tracy. From 1940 through 1948, she appeared in 11 films. Her most remembered role was portraying Margo Lane in three films from The Shadow series, starring opposite Kane Richmond.  Richmond and she teamed together in The Shadow Returns, Behind the Mask, and The Missing Lady, all in 1946. Her last role was alongside Randolph Scott and Marguerite Chapman in the 1948 Western Coroner Creek.

Personal life
In September 1936, Read eloped to Mexico with a young artist named William Paul III, but they divorced two months later.
Read married talent agent Bill Josephy in Santa Barbara on December 27, 1947. They had two boys, Damon Josephy and Quentin Josephy. She married actor William Talman in 1953. They had two children: Barbie and William Whitney Talman III. They divorced on August 23, 1960.

Read died in an apparent suicide on December 12, 1963, in Laguna Beach, California. She was 45 years old.

Selected filmography

 Three Smart Girls (1936) as Kay Craig
 The Man Who Cried Wolf (1937) as Nan
 Merry-Go-Round of 1938 (1937) as Clarice Stockbridge
 The Road Back (1937) as Lucie
 Make Way for Tomorrow (1937) as Rhoda Cooper
 The Mighty Treve (1937) as Aileen Fenno
 The Crime of Doctor Hallet (1938) as Claire Saunders
 Midnight Intruder (1938) as Patricia Hammond
 The Spellbinder (1939) as Janet Marlowe
 Sorority House (1939) as Dotty Spencer
 Married and in Love (1940) as Helen Yates
 Curtain Call (1940) as Helen Middleton
 Rubber Racketeers (1942) as Mary Dale
 Too Many Women (1942) as Linda Pearson
 The Shadow Returns (1946) as Margo Lane
 The Missing Lady (1946) as Margo Lane
 Death Valley (1946) as Mitzi
 Behind the Mask (1946) as Margo Lane
Ginger (1946) as Peggy Sullivan
 Key Witness (1947) as Martha Higby
 Coroner Creek (1948) as Abbe Miles

References

External links

1917 births
1963 deaths
Actresses from Ontario
Canadian film actresses
People from Thunder Bay
The Shadow
20th-century Canadian actresses
People from Laguna Beach, California
1963 suicides
Canadian emigrants to the United States